Reginald Leon Evans (born January 5, 1959) is a former American football running back in the National Football League (NFL) for the Washington Redskins.  He played college football at the University of Richmond. He is now coaching in Reston for the Reston Seahawks youth football program.

Evans is the current Board Chairman of the Fellowship of Christian Athletes for Loudoun County, Virginia and uses his influence as a former professional athlete to help younger athletes make the right choices in their lives as athletes, young men and women, and as followers of Christ. He also spends time mentoring coaches through his experiences and through life experiences of others.

Evans attended York High School in Yorktown, Virginia where he played football, basketball and track and field.  He became a Scholastic High School All-American.  Besides being All-District in all three sports, he was voted to participate in the Virginia High School All-Star game in football.  In track & field, he won a state title in the Long Jump his senior year.

External links
 

1959 births
Living people
Sportspeople from Newport News, Virginia
American football running backs
Richmond Spiders football players
Washington Redskins players